Ukwuani, Aboh, and Ndoni are a cluster of Igboid languages of Nigeria.

Writing system

References

Igboid languages